Bo Gösta Bohman (15 January 1911 – 12 August 1997) was a Swedish politician and the leader of the Swedish liberal conservative Moderate Party from 1970 to 1981, during a period in which the party strengthened its position in Swedish politics. He served as minister of economics during the three-party centre-right Swedish governments 1976–1978 and 1979–1981. He has since become a model for many Moderate politicians, especially in the Moderate Youth League.

His leadership saw a period of liberalisation of the Moderate policies, a process which continues to this day.

He was known for his love for the Stockholm archipelago, where he had a house on a little island in an archipelago named Sundskär located within the Norrtälje Municipality, and often used similes inspired by it in speech and articles. His book Thoughts On My Sweden outlined his political views in this context. He also wrote the book  (Sundskär, An archipelago neighboring the sea).

Bohman was awarded the Illis quorum in 1987.

His younger daughter, Mia Bohman, was married to former Prime Minister of Sweden Carl Bildt from 1984 to 1997.

Life before politics
Bohman was the son of the liberal managing director Conrad Bohman from Småland, and his wife Berta (formerly Gabrielsson). After finishing elementary school Bohman studied at the Svea Artillery Regiment and took his place as reserve officer in Kristianstad 1932. Four years later he attained a bachelor's degree in jurisprudence. In 1939 he married Gunnel Mossberg, a librarian.

References

External links

1911 births
1997 deaths
Leaders of the Moderate Party
Swedish Ministers for Finance
Economy ministers of Sweden
Politicians from Stockholm
Members of the Riksdag 1970–1973
Members of the Riksdag 1974–1976
Members of the Riksdag 1976–1979
Members of the Riksdag 1979–1982
Members of the Riksdag 1982–1985
Members of the Riksdag 1985–1988
Members of the Riksdag 1988–1991
Members of the Riksdag from the Moderate Party
Recipients of the Illis quorum